The 2000–01 NBA season was the Pacers' 25th season in the National Basketball Association, and 34th season as a franchise. The Pacers were coming off of an NBA Finals defeat to the Los Angeles Lakers in six games. During the off-season, the Pacers hired former Indiana University and Detroit Pistons legend Isiah Thomas as head coach, and acquired Jermaine O'Neal from the Portland Trail Blazers. With the departures of veteran players from the team that reached the Finals last year, the Pacers got off to a 5–2 start, but then struggled losing six of their next seven games, then later on holding a 21–27 record at the All-Star break. The Pacers played mediocre basketball all season long, and finished fourth in the Central Division with a record of 41–41. To qualify for the playoffs, the Pacers needed to win 9 of their final 11 games to secure the #8 seed in the Eastern Conference.

Last season's Most Improved Player Jalen Rose averaged 20.5 points, 5.0 rebounds and 6.0 assists per game, while Reggie Miller finished second on the team in scoring averaging 18.9 points per game, and O'Neal provided the team with 12.9 points, 9.8 rebounds and 2.8 blocks per game. In addition, Travis Best contributed 11.9 points, 6.1 assists and 1.4 steals per game off the bench, while Austin Croshere provided with 10.1 points per game also off the bench, and Al Harrington averaged 7.5 points and 4.9 rebounds per game.

In the Eastern Conference First Round of the playoffs, the Pacers faced the Philadelphia 76ers for the third straight year. Regular season MVP Allen Iverson and the top-seeded 76ers would need only four games to eliminate the Pacers, who managed to win Game 1 on the road 79–78, but lost the final three games of the series. The Sixers would reach the NBA Finals, but would lose in five games to the defending champion Los Angeles Lakers. Following the season, Sam Perkins was released to free agency and then retired, and Derrick McKey signed as a free agent with the Philadelphia 76ers during the next season.

Offseason

NBA Draft

Roster

Regular season

Season standings

Record vs. opponents

Game log

Regular season

|- align="center" bgcolor="#ffcccc"
| 1
| October 31, 2000
| @ San Antonio
| L 85–98
|
|
|
| Alamodome
| 0–1

|- align="center" bgcolor="#ffcccc"
| 2
| November 2, 2000
| @ Dallas
| L 88–94
|
|
|
| Reunion Arena
| 0–2
|- align="center" bgcolor="#ccffcc"
| 3
| November 4, 2000
| Chicago
| W 94–81
|
|
|
| Conseco Fieldhouse
| 1–2
|- align="center" bgcolor="#ccffcc"
| 4
| November 8, 2000
| Milwaukee
| W 108–97
|
|
|
| Conseco Fieldhouse
| 2–2
|- align="center" bgcolor="#ccffcc"
| 5
| November 10, 2000
| @ Washington
| W 86–74
|
|
|
| MCI Center
| 3–2
|- align="center" bgcolor="#ccffcc"
| 6
| November 11, 2000
| Detroit
| W 94–84
|
|
|
| Conseco Fieldhouse
| 4–2
|- align="center" bgcolor="#ccffcc"
| 7
| November 15, 2000
| @ Detroit
| W 92–88
|
|
|
| The Palace of Auburn Hills
| 5–2
|- align="center" bgcolor="#ffcccc"
| 8
| November 17, 2000
| Golden State
| L 90–92
|
|
|
| Conseco Fieldhouse
| 5–3
|- align="center" bgcolor="#ffcccc"
| 9
| November 18, 2000
| @ New Jersey
| L 92–97
|
|
|
| Continental Airlines Arena
| 5–4
|- align="center" bgcolor="#ffcccc"
| 10
| November 21, 2000
| Houston
| L 89–101
|
|
|
| Conseco Fieldhouse
| 5–5
|- align="center" bgcolor="#ffcccc"
| 11
| November 23, 2000
| Toronto
| L 91–111
|
|
|
| Conseco Fieldhouse
| 5–6
|- align="center" bgcolor="#ccffcc"
| 12
| November 24, 2000
| Washington
| W 99–87
|
|
|
| Conseco Fieldhouse
| 6–6
|- align="center" bgcolor="#ffcccc"
| 13
| November 28, 2000
| @ L.A. Lakers
| L 107–124
|
|
|
| Staples Center
| 6–7
|- align="center" bgcolor="#ffcccc"
| 14
| November 30, 2000
| @ Golden State
| L 95–99
|
|
|
| The Arena in Oakland
| 6–8

|- align="center" bgcolor="#ccffcc"
| 15
| December 1, 2000
| @ Vancouver
| W 86–76 (OT)
|
|
|
| General Motors Place
| 7–8
|- align="center" bgcolor="#ffcccc"
| 16
| December 3, 2000
| @ Milwaukee
| L 80–92
|
|
|
| Bradley Center
| 7–9
|- align="center" bgcolor="#ccffcc"
| 17
| December 5, 2000
| New Jersey
| W 88–64
|
|
|
| Conseco Fieldhouse
| 8–9
|- align="center" bgcolor="#ffcccc"
| 18
| December 6, 2000
| @ Charlotte
| L 88–91
|
|
|
| Charlotte Coliseum
| 8–10
|- align="center" bgcolor="#ccffcc"
| 19
| December 8, 2000
| @ Boston
| W 104–91
|
|
|
| FleetCenter
| 9–10
|- align="center" bgcolor="#ccffcc"
| 20
| December 9, 2000
| Charlotte
| W 99–96 (OT)
|
|
|
| Conseco Fieldhouse
| 10–10
|- align="center" bgcolor="#ffcccc"
| 21
| December 12, 2000
| @ Toronto
| L 90–104
|
|
|
| Air Canada Centre
| 10–11
|- align="center" bgcolor="#ccffcc"
| 22
| December 13, 2000
| Dallas
| W 97–92
|
|
|
| Conseco Fieldhouse
| 11–11
|- align="center" bgcolor="#ffcccc"
| 23
| December 15, 2000
| Cleveland
| L 95–103
|
|
|
| Conseco Fieldhouse
| 11–12
|- align="center" bgcolor="#ffcccc"
| 24
| December 16, 2000
| @ Minnesota
| L 110–113 (OT)
|
|
|
| Target Center
| 11–13
|- align="center" bgcolor="#ccffcc"
| 25
| December 19, 2000
| @ Chicago
| W 90–85
|
|
|
| United Center
| 12–13
|- align="center" bgcolor="#ffcccc"
| 26
| December 20, 2000
| Toronto
| L 98–99 (OT)
|
|
|
| Conseco Fieldhouse
| 12–14
|- align="center" bgcolor="#ffcccc"
| 27
| December 22, 2000
| Utah
| L 101–109
|
|
|
| Conseco Fieldhouse
| 12–15
|- align="center" bgcolor="#ffcccc"
| 28
| December 23, 2000
| @ Atlanta
| L 87–91
|
|
|
| Philips Arena
| 12–16
|- align="center" bgcolor="#ccffcc"
| 29
| December 25, 2000
| Orlando
| W 103–93
|
|
|
| Conseco Fieldhouse
| 13–16
|- align="center" bgcolor="#ffcccc"
| 30
| December 27, 2000
| @ Miami
| L 79–91
|
|
|
| American Airlines Arena
| 13–17
|- align="center" bgcolor="#ffcccc"
| 31
| December 30, 2000
| San Antonio
| L 77–89
|
|
|
| Conseco Fieldhouse
| 13–18

|- align="center" bgcolor="#ccffcc"
| 32
| January 2, 2001
| @ Seattle
| W 91–83
|
|
|
| KeyArena
| 14–18
|- align="center" bgcolor="#ffcccc"
| 33
| January 3, 2001
| @ Portland
| L 86–102
|
|
|
| Rose Garden
| 14–19
|- align="center" bgcolor="#ccffcc"
| 34
| January 5, 2001
| @ Sacramento
| W 93–91 (OT)
|
|
|
| ARCO Arena
| 15–19
|- align="center" bgcolor="#ccffcc"
| 35
| January 8, 2001
| @ L.A. Clippers
| W 85–82
|
|
|
| Staples Center
| 16–19
|- align="center" bgcolor="#ffcccc"
| 36
| January 9, 2001
| @ Utah
| L 99–103
|
|
|
| Delta Center
| 16–20
|- align="center" bgcolor="#ffcccc"
| 37
| January 11, 2001
| @ Phoenix
| L 85–93
|
|
|
| America West Arena
| 16–21
|- align="center" bgcolor="#ccffcc"
| 38
| January 13, 2001
| Miami
| W 87–71
|
|
|
| Conseco Fieldhouse
| 17–21
|- align="center" bgcolor="#ccffcc"
| 39
| January 15, 2001
| L.A. Clippers
| W 89–74
|
|
|
| Conseco Fieldhouse
| 18–21
|- align="center" bgcolor="#ccffcc"
| 40
| January 18, 2001
| Atlanta
| W 84–76
|
|
|
| Conseco Fieldhouse
| 19–21
|- align="center" bgcolor="#ccffcc"
| 41
| January 21, 2001
| @ New York
| W 87–74
|
|
|
| Madison Square Garden
| 20–21
|- align="center" bgcolor="#ffcccc"
| 42
| January 25, 2001
| Portland
| L 82–92
|
|
|
| Conseco Fieldhouse
| 20–22
|- align="center" bgcolor="#ffcccc"
| 43
| January 28, 2001
| Philadelphia
| L 81–86
|
|
|
| Conseco Fieldhouse
| 20–23
|- align="center" bgcolor="#ffcccc"
| 44
| January 30, 2001
| @ Orlando
| L 86–93
|
|
|
| Orlando Arena
| 20–24
|- align="center" bgcolor="#ffcccc"
| 45
| January 31, 2001
| Boston
| L 96–102 (OT)
|
|
|
| Conseco Fieldhouse
| 20–25

|- align="center" bgcolor="#ccffcc"
| 46
| February 2, 2001
| Denver
| W 103–94
|
|
|
| Conseco Fieldhouse
| 21–25
|- align="center" bgcolor="#ffcccc"
| 47
| February 3, 2001
| @ Milwaukee
| L 85–104
|
|
|
| Bradley Center
| 21–26
|- align="center" bgcolor="#ffcccc"
| 48
| February 6, 2001
| @ Miami
| L 89–102
|
|
|
| American Airlines Arena
| 21–27
|- align="center"
|colspan="9" bgcolor="#bbcaff"|All-Star Break
|- style="background:#cfc;"
|- bgcolor="#bbffbb"
|- align="center" bgcolor="#ffcccc"
| 49
| February 13, 2001
| Charlotte
| L 66–77
|
|
|
| Conseco Fieldhouse
| 21–28
|- align="center" bgcolor="#ccffcc"
| 50
| February 15, 2001
| Detroit
| W 82–73
|
|
|
| Conseco Fieldhouse
| 22–28
|- align="center" bgcolor="#ccffcc"
| 51
| February 18, 2001
| L.A. Lakers
| W 110–101
|
|
|
| Conseco Fieldhouse
| 23–28
|- align="center" bgcolor="#ccffcc"
| 52
| February 23, 2001
| @ Cleveland
| W 92–90
|
|
|
| Gund Arena
| 24–28
|- align="center" bgcolor="#ccffcc"
| 53
| February 25, 2001
| Minnesota
| W 110–100
|
|
|
| Conseco Fieldhouse
| 25–28
|- align="center" bgcolor="#ffcccc"
| 54
| February 26, 2001
| @ Charlotte
| L 72–82
|
|
|
| Charlotte Coliseum
| 25–29
|- align="center" bgcolor="#ccffcc"
| 55
| February 28, 2001
| Milwaukee
| W 99–86
|
|
|
| Conseco Fieldhouse
| 26–29

|- align="center" bgcolor="#ffcccc"
| 56
| March 2, 2001
| Seattle
| L 83–86
|
|
|
| Conseco Fieldhouse
| 26–30
|- align="center" bgcolor="#ffcccc"
| 57
| March 4, 2001
| New Jersey
| L 96–120
|
|
|
| Conseco Fieldhouse
| 26–31
|- align="center" bgcolor="#ffcccc"
| 58
| March 6, 2001
| @ New York
| L 83–97
|
|
|
| Madison Square Garden
| 26–32
|- align="center" bgcolor="#ffcccc"
| 59
| March 7, 2001
| New York
| L 75–79
|
|
|
| Conseco Fieldhouse
| 26–33
|- align="center" bgcolor="#ccffcc"
| 60
| March 9, 2001
| Cleveland
| W 99–84
|
|
|
| Conseco Fieldhouse
| 27–33
|- align="center" bgcolor="#ffcccc"
| 61
| March 11, 2001
| @ Detroit
| L 78–95
|
|
|
| The Palace of Auburn Hills
| 27–34
|- align="center" bgcolor="#ffcccc"
| 62
| March 13, 2001
| @ Houston
| L 118–127 (3OT)
|
|
|
| Compaq Center
| 27–35
|- align="center" bgcolor="#ffcccc"
| 63
| March 14, 2001
| @ Denver
| L 83–95
|
|
|
| Pepsi Center
| 27–36
|- align="center" bgcolor="#ccffcc"
| 64
| March 16, 2001
| Atlanta
| W 103–97
|
|
|
| Conseco Fieldhouse
| 28–36
|- align="center" bgcolor="#ccffcc"
| 65
| March 18, 2001
| Sacramento
| W 101–95
|
|
|
| Conseco Fieldhouse
| 29–36
|- align="center" bgcolor="#ffcccc"
| 66
| March 20, 2001
| @ Toronto
| L 81–102
|
|
|
| Air Canada Centre
| 29–37
|- align="center" bgcolor="#ccffcc"
| 67
| March 21, 2001
| Orlando
| W 96–95
|
|
|
| Conseco Fieldhouse
| 30–37
|- align="center" bgcolor="#ccffcc"
| 68
| March 23, 2001
| Vancouver
| W 95–75
|
|
|
| Conseco Fieldhouse
| 31–37
|- align="center" bgcolor="#ffcccc"
| 69
| March 25, 2001
| @ Orlando
| L 82–84
|
|
|
| Orlando Arena
| 31–38
|- align="center" bgcolor="#ccffcc"
| 70
| March 27, 2001
| @ Washington
| W 110–102
|
|
|
| MCI Center
| 32–38
|- align="center" bgcolor="#ffcccc"
| 71
| March 29, 2001
| @ Atlanta
| L 93–104
|
|
|
| Philips Arena
| 32–39
|- align="center" bgcolor="#ccffcc"
| 72
| March 30, 2001
| @ Boston
| W 92–87
|
|
|
| FleetCenter
| 33–39

|- align="center" bgcolor="#ffcccc"
| 73
| April 1, 2001
| @ Philadelphia
| L 93–104
|
|
|
| First Union Center
| 33–40
|- align="center" bgcolor="#ccffcc"
| 74
| April 3, 2001
| Phoenix
| W 85–81
|
|
|
| Conseco Fieldhouse
| 34–40
|- align="center" bgcolor="#ccffcc"
| 75
| April 6, 2001
| Chicago
| W 100–93
|
|
|
| Conseco Fieldhouse
| 35–40
|- align="center" bgcolor="#ccffcc"
| 76
| April 8, 2001
| @ New Jersey
| W 108–83
|
|
|
| Continental Airlines Arena
| 36–40
|- align="center" bgcolor="#ccffcc"
| 77
| April 9, 2001
| Washington
| W 100–78
|
|
|
| Conseco Fieldhouse
| 37–40
|- align="center" bgcolor="#ccffcc"
| 78
| April 11, 2001
| New York
| W 100–93
|
|
|
| Conseco Fieldhouse
| 38–40
|- align="center" bgcolor="#ccffcc"
| 79
| April 13, 2001
| Boston
| W 113–108 (OT)
|
|
|
| Conseco Fieldhouse
| 39–40
|- align="center" bgcolor="#ccffcc"
| 80
| April 15, 2001
| @ Chicago
| W 93–86
|
|
|
| United Center
| 40–40
|- align="center" bgcolor="#ffcccc"
| 81
| April 17, 2001
| Philadelphia
| L 105–111 (OT)
|
|
|
| Conseco Fieldhouse
| 40–41
|- align="center" bgcolor="#ccffcc"
| 82
| April 18, 2001
| @ Cleveland
| W 105–101 (OT)
|
|
|
| Gund Arena
| 41–41

Playoffs

|- align="center" bgcolor="#ccffcc"
| 1
| April 21, 2001
| @ Philadelphia
| W 79–78
| Miller,Rose (17)
| O'Neal (20)
| Best (10)
| First Union Center20,613
| 1–0
|- align="center" bgcolor="#ffcccc"
| 2
| April 24, 2001
| @ Philadelphia
| L 98–116
| Miller (41)
| O'Neal (11)
| Best (6)
| First Union Center20,739
| 1–1
|- align="center" bgcolor="#ffcccc"
| 3
| April 28, 2001
| Philadelphia
| L 87–92
| Miller (35)
| Best (11)
| Best (9)
| Conseco Fieldhouse18,345
| 1–2
|- align="center" bgcolor="#ffcccc"
| 4
| May 2, 2001
| Philadelphia
| L 85–88
| Miller (32)
| O'Neal (14)
| Best (12)
| Conseco Fieldhouse18,345
| 1–3

Awards, records, and honors

Player statistics

Season

Playoffs

Player Statistics Citation:

Transactions

References

  Pacers on Basketball Reference

Indiana Pacers seasons
Pace
Pace
Indiana